The 29th Guam Legislature was a meeting of the Guam Legislature. It convened in Hagatna, Guam on January 1, 2007 and ended on January 5, 2009, during the 1st and 2nd years of Felix P. Camacho's 2nd Gubernatorial Term.

In the 2006 Guamanian general election, the Republican Party of Guam won a bare majority of seats in the Guam Legislature. Following the death of Republican Senator Antonio R. Unpingco on October 18, 2007, a special election was held in January 2008, at which former Democratic Senator Benjamin J.F. Cruz was elected, shifting the majority to the Democratic Party of Guam. The Democratic caucus took control of the leadership of the 29th Guam Legislature in March 2008

Party Summary

Leadership

Until September 2008

Legislative
 Speaker: Mark Forbes
 Vice Speaker: Edward J.B. Calvo
 Legislative Secretary: Ray Tenorio

Majority (Republican)
 Majority Leader: Mark Forbes

Minority (Democratic)
 Minority Leader: Rory J. Respicio
 Asst. Minority Leader: Judith P. Guthertz, DPA
 Minority Whip: Adolpho B. Palacios Sr.
 Asst. Minority Whip: Vicente C. "Ben" Pangelinan

After September 2008

Legislative
 Speaker: Judith T.P. Won Pat
 Vice Speaker: David L.G. Shimizu
 Legislative Secretary: Tina Rose Muna Barnes

Majority (Democratic)
 Majority Leader: Rory J. Respicio
 Asst. Majority Leader: Judith P. Guthertz, DPA
 Majority Whip: Adolpho B. Palacios Sr.
 Asst. Majority Whip: Vicente C. "Ben" Pangelinan

Minority (Republican)
 Minority Leader: Mark Forbes

Membership

Committees

References 

Politics of Guam
Political organizations based in Guam
Legislature of Guam